Maria Klemetz (born 28 December 1976) is a Finnish sailor. She competed in the Yngling event at the 2008 Summer Olympics.

References

External links
 

1976 births
Living people
Finnish female sailors (sport)
Olympic sailors of Finland
Sailors at the 2008 Summer Olympics – Yngling
People from Kuusankoski
Sportspeople from Kymenlaakso